Metal Fatigue is the third studio album by guitarist Allan Holdsworth, released in 1985 through Enigma Records (United States) and JMS–Cream Records (Europe).

Critical reception

Daniel Gioffre of AllMusic awarded Metal Fatigue 4.5 stars out of 5, calling it "One of the most important fusion records of the '80s" and "Holdsworth's best work. [...] Absolutely essential for those who like their rock with a healthy dose of jazz". The title track was listed as one of the highlights, as well as the contributions of drummer Chad Wackerman and bassist Jimmy Johnson, whom he described as "virtuosos in their own right".

Track listing

Personnel
Allan Holdsworth – guitar, engineering, producer
Paul Williams – vocals (tracks 1, 4)
Paul Korda – vocals (track 6)
Alan Pasqua – keyboard
Chad Wackerman – drums (tracks 1–4)
Gary Husband – drums (track 5)
"Mac Hine" – drum machine (track 6)
Jimmy Johnson – bass (tracks 1–4, 6)
Gary Willis – bass (track 5)

Technical
Robert Feist – engineering
Dan Humann – engineering
Dennis McKay – engineering
Biff Vincent – engineering
Gary Wagner – engineering
Francois Bardol – cover art

References

External links
Metal Fatigue at therealallanholdsworth.com (archived)
Allan Holdsworth "Metal Fatigue" at Guitar Nine

Allan Holdsworth albums
1985 albums
Enigma Records albums